Royalty Records is a Canadian country music record label and distributor established in 1974.

Royalty artists

 Roy Acuff
 After Tuesday
 Colin Amey
 Sharon Anderson
 Eddy Arnold
 Gord Bamford
 Tommy Banks
 Bobby Bare
 Barnes/Hampton
 Eli Barsi
 Lisa Brokop
 Floyd Cramer
 Heather Dawn
 Dave Dudley
 The Emeralds
 Gary Fjellgaard
 Foster Martin Band
 George Fox
 Steve Fox
 Frankie & Walter
 Friday Night Satellites
 Vern Gosdin
 Gil Grand
 Jason Greeley
 Gaby Haas
 Kenny Hess
 Lisa Hewitt
 Hey Romeo
 Johnny Horton
 The Jeffersons
 Brad Johner
 The Johner Brothers
 Melanie Laine
 John Landry
 Jimmy Martin
 McQueen
 Tony Michael
 Big Miller & Tommy Banks
 Katie Mission
 Bill Monroe
 Craig Moritz
 Megan Morrison
 Bev Munro
 Jimmy C. Newman
 Po' Boy Swing
 Roy Orbison
 The Orchard
 Jimmy Arthur Ordge
 Dolly Parton
 Jesse Pessoa
 Poverty Plainsmen
 Aaron Pritchett
 REO Speedwagon
 Jessica Robinson
 Santana
 Krysta Scoggins
 Shifty Morgan
 Showdown & Gary Lee
 Ricky Skaggs
 Joyce Smith
 R. Harlan Smith & Chris Nielsen
 Duane Steele
 Jamie C. Taylor
 Tenille
 Tex Pistols
 Rick Tippe
 Ben Tobiasson
 Track One A.B.
 Laura Vinson
 Western Senators
 Hank Williams

See also
 List of record labels

References

External links
 

Record labels established in 1974
Canadian independent record labels
Canadian country music record labels
Companies based in Edmonton
1974 establishments in Alberta